The Rife Farmstead is a historic farm property in rural Benton County, Arkansas. The house was built in 1928 by Luther Rife, and is unusual in this rural setting, where most houses are vernacular in form. The property original had two c. 1910 barns when the property was surveyed in 1988; these are apparently no longer standing.

The property was listed on the National Register of Historic Places in 1988.

See also
National Register of Historic Places listings in Benton County, Arkansas

References

Houses on the National Register of Historic Places in Arkansas
Houses completed in 1910
Houses in Benton County, Arkansas
National Register of Historic Places in Benton County, Arkansas
1910 establishments in Arkansas
Bungalow architecture in Arkansas
American Craftsman architecture in Arkansas